Oruro is a city in Bolivia, the capital of the Oruro Department.

Oruro may also refer to:

 Carnaval de Oruro, a religious and cultural festival
 Oruro Department, one of nine departments in Bolivia